Marpe may refer to:

 Marpe (Salwey), a river of North Rhine-Westphalia, Germany
 Marpe, one of the Amazons challenging Heracles according to Diodorus Siculus
 Detlev Marpe, German engineer